De Kiel is a village in the Netherlands and is part of the Coevorden municipality in Drenthe. 

De Kiel was first mentioned in 1899 as Kiel and means "the deeper part of a ditch". It used to be spread over six municipalities, and before that seven marken. In 1942, the borders were corrected.

See also
 Coevorden

References

Coevorden
Populated places in Drenthe